Troublesome Creek is a creek in Breathitt, Perry and Knott counties, Kentucky. The surrounding watershed is also named for it. The creek joins the North Fork Kentucky River downstream near the unincorporated community of Haddix.

The "Blue Fugates", a family so-called because some of them had blue skin as hereditary sufferers from methemoglobinemia, lived in the area in the 19th and 20th centuries.

See also
List of rivers of Kentucky

References 

Rivers of Breathitt County, Kentucky
Rivers of Knott County, Kentucky
Rivers of Perry County, Kentucky
Rivers of Kentucky